Hellesen is a surname. Notable people with the surname include:

Gunnar Fredrik Hellesen (1913–2005), Norwegian politician
Hanne Hellesen (1801–1844), Danish painter
Richard Hellesen (born 1956), American playwright
Thorvald Hellesen (1888–1937), Norwegian abstract artist, designer and painter
Wilhelm Hellesen (1836–1892), Danish inventor and industrialist